Tematai Le Gayic (11 October, 2000) is a French Polynesian politician and member of the French National Assembly. He is the youngest deputy in the French Fifth Republic. He is a member of Tavini Huiraatira, and sits with the New Ecologic and Social People's Union in the National Assembly.

Le Gayic was born in Papeetee and grew up in Tubuai in the Austral Islands. He returned to Tahiti when he was 10 and was educated in Papara, before studying history and political science at Paris 8 University Vincennes-Saint-Denis. After graduating in 2021, he began a master's degree in political science at the School for Advanced Studies in the Social Sciences.

He was elected to the French National Assembly in the 2022 French legislative election, defeating Tapura Huiraatira's Nicole Bouteau. On his election he became the youngest deputy in the Fifth Republic.

References

Living people
2000 births
People from Papeete
Paris 8 University Vincennes-Saint-Denis alumni
Deputies of the 16th National Assembly of the French Fifth Republic
Tavini Huiraatira politicians
21st-century French politicians